Jürgen Eberwein (born 10 November 1945) is a German figure skater. He competed in the men's singles event at the 1968 Winter Olympics.

References

1945 births
Living people
German male single skaters
Olympic figure skaters of West Germany
Figure skaters at the 1968 Winter Olympics
Figure skaters from Berlin